Nosekiella is a genus of proturans in the family Acerentomidae.

Species
 Nosekiella behanae Nosek, 1977
 Nosekiella condei (Tuxen, 1955)
 Nosekiella danica Condé, 1947
 Nosekiella hoogstraali Nosek, 1980
 Nosekiella urasi Imadaté, 1981

References

Protura